Administrative counties were subnational divisions of England used for local government from 1889 to 1974. They were created by the Local Government Act 1888, which established an elected county council for each area. Some geographically large historic counties were divided into several administrative counties, each with its own county council. The administrative counties operated until 1974, when they were replaced by a system of metropolitan and non-metropolitan counties under the Local Government Act 1972.

History

Introduction of county councils

In 1888 the government, led by the Tory prime minister Lord Salisbury established county councils throughout England and Wales, covering areas known as administrative counties.  Many larger towns and cities were given the status of county borough, with similar powers and independent of county council control. Under the Act, each county borough was an "administrative county of itself".

Cambridgeshire, Lincolnshire, Northamptonshire, Suffolk, Sussex, and Yorkshire were split up for administrative purposes, following historical divisions used by the Courts of Quarter Sessions.

Additionally there was a County of London which covered the area today known as Inner London.  The Isle of Wight was previously administered as part of Hampshire but became its own administrative county in 1890.

In 1894 a uniform two-tier system was established outside the county boroughs and London, with subdivisions of the administrative counties called urban districts, rural districts and municipal boroughs. The structure was complete once the County of London was divided into metropolitan boroughs in 1900.

Most exclaves of counties were eliminated under the Counties (Detached Parts) Act 1844, but in 1894 county councils were given the power to adjust county boundaries, and most of the remaining anomalies were removed in the next few years. For example, the Measham area of Derbyshire was transferred to Leicestershire in 1897.

Map 1890–1965
The map shows the counties and the county boroughs.  When a county borough expanded into territory of a county that was not the one it came from, maps sometimes showed this as an increase in size of the county which the county borough was associated with.

Monmouthshire, not shown on the map, was reckoned for some legal purposes among the English counties for most of this period.

The 1888 Act did not contain a list of administrative counties: it was not until 1933 and the passing of a new Local Government Act that they were enumerated in the Act's schedule.  Unlike the 1888 Act, the 1933 Act did not include county boroughs as administrative counties.

In legislation and formal documents the suffix "shire" was generally not used: for example, Bedfordshire was referred to as "the administrative county of Bedford" and the Northamptonshire council as the "county council of Northampton". In the case of Lancashire and Cheshire the councils were officially the "county council of the palatine county". Shropshire was always officially entitled the "county of Salop". The right of Berkshire to be described as a "royal county" was recognised by the monarch in 1958. On 1 April 1959 the administrative county of Southampton was renamed as Hampshire.

This system was the basis of the ceremonial counties used for Lieutenancy – except that Cambridgeshire, Hampshire, Lincolnshire, Northamptonshire, Suffolk and Sussex were not split for Lieutenancy.  (Yorkshire, however, was).

Area and population
The table lists the area and population of each administrative county at the censuses of 1891 and 1961.

Several county councils had administrative headquarters outside of their area. This was usually because the traditional county town was a county borough. The headquarters of Derbyshire, Leicestershire and Nottinghamshire county councils were moved from the county boroughs to locations within their respective administrative counties.

 County borough, outside the administrative county
 In the administrative county of London
 Chester Castle, in which County Hall is situated, was a civil parish and exclave of the Chester Rural District and thus an exclave of the administrative county and an enclave in the county borough.
 County borough from 1914
 Devon County Buildings Area transferred from the county borough to the administrative county of Devon (of which it formed an exclave) in 1963
 County borough from 1891
 Moot Hall Precincts were an exclave of the administrative county within the county borough of Newcastle upon tyne
The decision to move the county council headquarters was made on 15 April 1890, and the new county hall opened 14 November 1893. Kingston was removed from the administrative county of Surrey in 1965, becoming part of the Royal Borough of Kingston upon Thames in Greater London
 County borough from 1915

Alterations in boundaries
The boundaries of the administrative counties changed considerably over time. The reasons for this were threefold: the growth of towns on either side of an existing boundary, the creation and extension of county boroughs and the elimination of outlying exclaves and other anomalies.

As urbanisation increased, and suburbs were built on a scale not seen before, the urban areas surrounding various towns and cities started to cross traditional county borders. The Local Government Act 1888 provided that in the case that an urban sanitary district crossed a county border, the entire district would be considered part of the county in which the larger part was.  This condition was maintained with the expansion of urban districts and municipal boroughs.

Towns that were split by historic borders and were unified in one administrative county include Banbury, Mossley, Tamworth, Todmorden.

Urban districts to annexe areas in another counties include:

Little Bowden in Northamptonshire, annexed by Market Harborough, Leicestershire
Mellor and Ludworth, in Derbyshire, annexed by Marple in Cheshire (and now in Greater Manchester)

Additionally, the territory and population of administrative counties was reduced by the increasing numbers of county boroughs, and extensions thereof. This was recognised as a problem, and the process of creation and enlargement of such boroughs was made more difficult by the Local Government (County Boroughs and Adjustments) Act 1926. By June 1970 25% of the population were within the county boroughs.

On creation, many of the administrative counties had a number of exclaves. During the 1890s most of these were eliminated, with parishes being exchanged between counties. The boundaries of Gloucestershire, Worcestershire and Wiltshire contained numerous enclaves and exclaves, and were realigned in 1931.

Greater London

Throughout the next century, debates took place about what should be done about local government in respect of the increasing urbanisation of the country.  Proposals to expand or change county boroughs or to create larger urban counties were discussed, but nothing happened until 1963, when legislation was passed to come into effect in 1965.

The County of London was abolished, and replaced by Greater London, a sui generis council area, taking the three of the surrounding county boroughs, more of Surrey and Kent, parts of Essex and Hertfordshire and consuming nearly all of Middlesex – the remaining parts being ceded to Surrey and Hertfordshire.  Some other changes took place, such as the Soke of Peterborough and Huntingdonshire being merged into Huntingdon and Peterborough, and the merger of the original Cambridgeshire with the Isle of Ely to form Cambridgeshire and Isle of Ely.

Map 1965–1974

The map shows the counties and county boroughs just prior to their abolition in 1974.

Abolition

In 1974 the administrative counties were abolished by the Local Government Act 1972 and replaced with the metropolitan and non-metropolitan counties of England.

See also
Administrative counties of Ireland
List of articles about local government in the United Kingdom
Postal counties of the United Kingdom

References

External links
History of the counties
Find a historical place

England geography-related lists
History of local government in England
Administrative counties
Counties of England

eo:Angla provinco
it:Contee inglesi